The 2018 Sydney to Hobart Yacht Race was the 74th annual running of the Sydney to Hobart Yacht Race. Hosted by the Cruising Yacht Club of Australia and sponsored by Rolex, it began at Sydney Harbour at 13:00 on 26 December 2018, before heading south for  via the Tasman Sea, Bass Strait, Storm Bay and up the River Derwent, to cross the finish line in Hobart, Tasmania. This race marked the 20 year anniversary of the 1998 Sydney to Hobart Yacht Race, when 6 sailors died due to severe weather.

A fleet of 85 boats contested the race and 79 finished. Line honours were claimed by Wild Oats XI in a time of 1 day, 19 hours, 17 minutes and 21 seconds. The Tattersall's Cup went to Alive (Duncan Hine), the first Tasmanian boat to win handicap since 1979.

Results

Line honours (Top 10)

Handicap results (Top 10)

References

Sydney to Hobart Yacht Race
Sydney
Sydney
December 2018 sports events in Australia